Yeh Ishq Haaye is an Indian television series that aired on STAR One. The show premiered on 1 November 2010 and ran till 6 August 2011.

Plot
Yeh Ishq Haaye is set in small town Agra and traces the lives of childhood friends Manjari and Akshay. Manjari Chaturvedi is a carefree teenager who likes to hang out with her friends. Akshay runs a café and has secretly been in love with Majari for a long time. Pooja, Manjari's elder sister, falls for Akshay after a misunderstanding leads her to believe that he returns her feelings. Manjari instead falls in love with Ranbir. Akshay, on Majari's insistence gets engaged to Pooja.

Tired of her carefree attitude, Manjari's parents want to get her married so she settles down but Manjari decides to run away to Mumbai on Ranbir's advice. Akshay insists on accompanying her and on reaching Mumbai, they realise that Ranbir is in fact Sanjay and he cheats girls using a fake identity. Akshay and Manjari later decide to stay in Mumbai and make a name for themselves. Manjari starts to fall in love with Akshay but stays away from him as he is Pooja's fiancé. Back in Agra, Pooja learns of Akshay's feelings for Manjari. She comes to Mumbai and plans to separate them but later realises their love and leaves.

Despite their challenges, Manjari and Akshay finally unite.

Music 
Title theme song was sung by Alisha Chinai & Mohit Pathak and penned down by Amitabh Bhattacharya.

Cast

 Srishty Rode as Manjari
 Neetu Naval Singh as Pooja, Manjari's elder sister
 Raunaq Ahuja as Akshay Shukla, Manjari's childhood friend who has been in love with her
 Jaya Ojha as Manjari's mother
 Pankaj Berry as Manjari's father
 Rahul Arora as Sanjay Sharma
 Anand Suryavanshi as Ranbir Malhotra
 Yashdeep Nain as Ajay Shukla, Akshay's brother

References

External links
 http://www.starone.in/show.aspx?sid=75
 http://uk.startv.com/?q=synopsis/yeh-ishq-haaye
 http://www.starone.in/news/840/latest-offerings-from-star-one.aspx

Star One (Indian TV channel) original programming
2010 Indian television series debuts
2011 Indian television series endings
Indian drama television series